Cristina Gomez (born 6 July 1998 in San Pedro del Pinatar) is a Spanish professional squash player. As of February 2018, she was ranked number 97 in the world. She is in Spain women's national squash team.

References

1998 births
Living people
Spanish female squash players
Competitors at the 2017 World Games
21st-century Spanish women